Lyambirsky District (Lämbiŕbuje; , Lämbireń ajmak; , Lämberä rayonı) is an administrative and municipal district (raion), one of the twenty-two in the Republic of Mordovia, Russia. It is located in the northern and central parts of the republic. Its administrative center is the rural locality (a selo) of Lyambir. As of the 2010 Census, the total population of the district was 34,142, with the population of Lyambir accounting for 24.8% of that number.

Administrative and municipal status
Within the framework of administrative divisions, Lyambirsky District is one of the twenty-two in the republic. The district is divided into sixteen selsoviets which comprise seventy rural localities. As a municipal division, the district is incorporated as Lyambirsky Municipal District. Its sixteen selsoviets are incorporated into sixteen rural settlements within the municipal district. The selo of Lyambir serves as the administrative center of both the administrative and municipal district.

References

Notes

Sources



 
Districts of Mordovia